El Cubano Libre (English: The Free Cuban) was the paper that was established by Che Guevara during the midst of the Cuban Revolution. It was used as counter-propaganda to the Batista dictatorship and to inform the Cuban people about the mission of the July 26 Movement.

Origins

El Cubano Libre was established by Guevara in November 1957 in the Sierra Maestra. Guevara took the name from a paper published by Cuban patriots during the independence wars against Spanish colonialism in the 19th century.

References

Newspapers published in Cuba
Publications established in 1957